The Websdaneaceae are a family of smut fungi in the class Ustilaginomycetes. Collectively, the family contains 2 genera and 22 species.

References

External links

Ustilaginomycotina
Basidiomycota families